Lorusso is an Italian surname, and it may refer to:

 Benedetto Lorusso (born 1990), Italian footballer 
 Francesco Lorusso (1952–1977), Italian militant 
 Nicholas Lorusso (born 1967), American attorney
 Salvatore Lorusso (fl. 1970s–2020s), Italian chemist and art historian

See also
 Lorusso Industries, a US restaurant foodservice retailer unrelated to Italian cuisine food operators; replaced by Cracker Barrel in 1990
 Lo Russo